Paerisades II or Parysades was king of the Bosporan Kingdom from 284 to 245 BC. He may have been a son of either Spartokos III, or Satyros II.

Reign
Paerisades II was either the son or cousin of Spartokos III, a previous ruler but may have the son of Satyros II. In the aftermath of the Bosporan Civil War, Eumelos, Spartokos III's father and a Bosporan king, executed the families and friends of his brothers Satyros and Prytanis. Satyros's youngest son, named Paerisades, survived and fled into Scythia where he took refuge with its king, Agarus.

Paerisades was unexpectedly active in diplomacy throughout the Hellenistic kingdoms of the Diadochi. He is mentioned in a letter from Apollonius to Zenon as having sent ambassadors to the court of Ptolemy II, the pharaoh of Ptolemaic Egypt, who took the opportunity to sight-see. Also, he was a donor and made cup offerings at Delos together with the Macedonian king Antigonus II, and a woman named Stratonice, not to be confused with Stratonice of Macedon, Antigonus's grandmother, who died no later than 301 BC.

Succession
After having ruled for around 39 years, Paerisades died in 245 BC. He was succeeded by his presumably eldest son Spartokos IV, who ruled for only a brief period of about 5 years. Spartokos IV was then succeeded by Leukon II, Paerisades's younger son, who killed his elder brother in a dispute over adultery with Leukon's own wife.

See also
Ptolemaic Egypt
Kingdom of Macedon
Bosporan Civil War

External links
Collection of coins from the Bosporan Kingdom here

References

3rd-century BC monarchs
Monarchs of the Bosporan Kingdom
Spartocid dynasty